Boophone haemanthoides is a plant species native to Namibia and the Cape Provinces of South Africa. It is a bulb-forming herb with more than half of its scaly bulb appearing above ground. It produces a rather large umbel of pink flowers with narrow tepals.

References

Amaryllidoideae
Flora of Namibia
Flora of the Cape Provinces